Rosyth Football Club are a Scottish football club based in Rosyth, Fife, who currently play in the . Until 2006, they were known as Rosyth Recreation. The team have been managed since March 2018 by Brian Muirhead.

A Junior football team was first established in Rosyth in 1916, with an affiliated senior team being established in 1919 that were called Rosyth Dockyard Recreation. The Junior side folded in 1926 only to be reformed after World War II in 1946. It was in that year that Rosyth attracted a record crowd of 4000 in a cup tie against Bo'ness United; three seasons later, Rosyth (or "The Rec" as they were known) enjoyed their most successful period when they won the treble – Fife League, Fife Cup and Cowdenbeath Cup. This club folded in 1957.

In 1992, after several decades without a Junior football team, semi-professional football returned to the Garden City. Local team Dunfermline Jubilee Athletic (founded in 1967) were without a ground so relocated to New Recreation Park and renamed themselves Rosyth Recreation. The club left Recreation Park in 2018 to move to the nearby Fleet Grounds.

Former Scotland international, Stevie Crawford, began his career at the club before leaving for Raith Rovers in late 1992.

Roysth Recreation initially competed in the Fife Junior League, with a best finish of second in 2004–05. The SJFA restructured prior to the 2006–07 season and Rosyth found themselves in the East Region Premier League, where they finished third in their first season but were soon relegated. Their best result in the East Region's bottom tier was 2nd in 2008–09.

The club were top of the East Region South Premier League when the season was declared null & void due to the COVID-19 pandemic, before their move to the East of Scotland League in May 2020.

In September 2022, the Rec’s decided to hire Greig Denham former ex professional defender with Motherwell FC, St Mirren FC, Falkirk FC [captain], Stenhousemuir F.C, East Stirlingshire F.C and winning the Scottish Junior Cup and Super League with Linlithgow Rose in 2007.  Greig replaced former manager Brian Muirhead. His assistant manager is ex professional Steve Kerrigan (footballer) who joins him at the club.

Honours 
Fife League Cup: 2003–04

References

External links

Football clubs in Scotland
Scottish Junior Football Association clubs
Association football clubs established in 1992
Football clubs in Fife
1992 establishments in Scotland
East of Scotland Football League teams
Rosyth